Little Australia is a name for any of the various communities where Australians congregate upon emigrating to other countries. Examples can be found in the United States, Canada, and the United Kingdom. The concept of "Little Australia" holds many different aspects of the Australian culture. Common features include shops selling Australasian goods and restaurants lining the streets. A "Little Australia" strives essentially to have a sample of the culture of Australia transplanted to the midst of a large non-Australian city.

Mulberry Street and Mott Street, Manhattan  

Since 2010, the world's largest Little Australia has emerged and is growing in Nolita, Manhattan, New York City. Mulberry Street and Mott Street in Lower Manhattan are commonly referred to by Australian expats as "Little Australia" due to the influence of Australian and New Zealand cafe culture in the neighborhood, which includes establishments such as Ruby's, Two Hands, Bluestone Lane, Bluestone Lane Bowery Cafe, T2, Charley St, Cafe Grumpy, Egg Shop, Musket Room and Happy Bones. Little Australia is adjacent to Little Italy and Chinatown in Manhattan. 

In 2011, there were an estimated 20,000 Australian residents of New York City, nearly quadrupling the 5,537 in 2005.

Earl's Court, London  
   
Earl's Court in London had the nickname "Kangaroo Valley" or "Roo Valley", although many Australasian visitors now go to cheaper districts to the north or west. 
   
When Barry Humphries went (by sea) to London in 1959, he and then wife Rosalind lived in Ladbroke Grove in Kensington. He made an impromptu visit to "an Earl's Court pub, in the middle of Kangaroo Valley, as it was sometimes called. He fell physically ill and frightened by what he saw. The packs of loutish Australian youths swilling beer and swearing revived painful memories of the bullies at Melbourne Grammar." This theme re-emerged more affectionately from 1964 in Humphries' Barry McKenzie series; the character lived in an Earl's Court flat.
   
In 1962, Clive James went (also by sea; only one friend could afford to fly) to London with a week's accommodation booked in  Earl's Court, which "in those days was still nicknamed 'Kangaroo Valley'". He said that there was no mistaking the Earl's Court Australians, with "jug ears, short haircuts ... and open, freckled, eyeless faces" despite their "navy-blue English duffle-coats; though they had not yet taken to carrying twelve-packs of Foster's Lager, and the broad-brimmed Akubra hat with corks dangling from the brim was never to be more than a myth".  After he moved, he "vowed never to enter Earl's Court again".

Whistler, British Columbia 
The town of Whistler, British Columbia holds a congregation of Australians and has been described as a ‘Little Australia’ due to the strong Australian culture present. Australian Alpine skier Jono Brauer coined the term "Whistralia" to refer to the ski village in a 2010 interview, and this has since become a nickname. In 2010, it was estimated that Australians made up 34% of the workforce for Whistler-Blackcomb ski resort. Australian snacks such as meat pies, Tim Tams, and Vegemite are sold at supermarkets in Whistler, and Australia Day is celebrated, with multiple pubs throwing organised party events.

See also
 Australian diaspora
 New Australia

References

Australian culture
Australian diaspora
Ethnic enclaves in Canada
Ethnic enclaves in the United Kingdom
Ethnic enclaves in the United States
Earls Court
Ethnic enclaves in Asia